John Joseph Haley Jr. (August 10, 1897 – June 6, 1979) was an  American actor, comedian, dancer, radio host, singer, drummer and vaudevillian. He was best known for his portrayal of the Tin Man and his farmhand counterpart Hickory in the 1939 Metro-Goldwyn-Mayer film The Wizard of Oz.

Early life
Haley was born on August 10, 1897. His father was a waiter by trade, and later a ship's steward. He died in the wreck of the schooner Charles A. Briggs at Nahant, Massachusetts on February 1, 1898, when Jack was almost six months old. He had one older brother, William Anthony "Bill" Haley, a musician, who died of pneumonia in 1916 at the age of twenty-one after contracting tuberculosis.

Career

Haley headlined in vaudeville as a song-and-dance comedian. One of his closest friends was Fred Allen, who would frequently mention "Mr. Jacob Haley of Newton Highlands, Massachusetts" on the air. Haley made a few phonograph records in 1923, and in the early 1930s, Haley starred in comedy shorts for Vitaphone in Brooklyn, New York. His wide-eyed, good-natured expression gained him supporting roles in musical feature films, including Poor Little Rich Girl with Shirley Temple, Higher and Higher with Frank Sinatra and the Irving Berlin musical Alexander's Ragtime Band. Both Poor Little Rich Girl and Alexander's Ragtime Band were released by Twentieth Century-Fox. Haley was under contract to them and appeared in the Fox films Rebecca of Sunnybrook Farm and Pigskin Parade, marking his first appearance with Judy Garland.
Haley hosted a radio show from 1937 to 1939 known to many as The Jack Haley Show. The first season (1937-1938), the show was sponsored by Log Cabin Syrup and was known as The Log Cabin Jamboree. The next season (1938-1939), the show was sponsored by Wonder Bread and was known as The Wonder Show. During the second season the show featured Gale Gordon and Lucille Ball as regular radio performers. Haley returned to musical comedies in the 1940s. Most of his '40s work was for RKO Radio Pictures. He left the studio in 1947 when he refused to appear in a remake of RKO's Seven Keys to Baldpate. Phillip Terry took the role. He subsequently went into real estate, taking guest roles in television series over the next couple of decades.

"The Tin Man" in The Wizard of Oz

Metro-Goldwyn-Mayer hired Haley for the part of the Tin Man in The Wizard of Oz. He replaced song-and-dance comedian Buddy Ebsen, who had suffered a severe allergic reaction after inhaling aluminum powder from his silver face makeup, which triggered a congenital bronchial condition; the dust settled in Ebsen's lungs and, within a few days of principal photographic testing, he found himself struggling to breathe. For Haley, to avoid the same problem, the dust was converted into a paste—even so, the paste caused an eye infection that sidelined Haley for four shooting days. Surgical treatment averted serious or permanent damage to Haley's eyes. Haley also portrayed the Tin Man's Kansas counterpart, Hickory Twicker, one of Aunt Em and Uncle Henry's farmhands.

Haley did not remember the makeup or the costume fondly. Interviewed about the film years later by Tom Snyder, he related that many fans assumed making the film was a fun experience. Haley said, "Like hell it was. It was work!" For his role as the Tin Woodman, Haley spoke in the same soft tone he used when reading bedtime stories to his children. Oz was one of only two films Haley made for MGM. The other was Pick a Star, a 1937 Hal Roach production distributed by Metro-Goldwyn-Mayer.

Personal life

Haley was raised Roman Catholic. He was a member of the Good Shepherd Parish and the Catholic Motion Picture Guild in Beverly Hills, California. His nephew Bob Dornan served as a Republican congressman for California.

Final years and death

Haley remained active until a week before his death. 

On Friday June 1, 1979, Haley suffered a heart attack. He died on June 6, 1979, at the UCLA Medical Center in Los Angeles at the age of 81. His funeral was held at the Church of the Good Shepherd and the eulogy was given by Ray Bolger who concluded it by saying, "It's going to be awfully lonely on that Yellow Brick Road now, Jack."

He is buried in Holy Cross Cemetery, Culver City, California.

Haley's autobiography, Heart of the Tin Man, was published in 2000.

Film

Short films

Broadway

References

External links

1897 births
1979 deaths
American people of Canadian descent
American male film actors
American male musical theatre actors
American male stage actors
Male actors from Boston
Vaudeville performers
20th-century American male actors
Burials at Holy Cross Cemetery, Culver City
People from Atlantic City, New Jersey
Paramount Pictures contract players
Male actors from New Jersey
Musicians from Atlantic City, New Jersey
Catholics from New Jersey
20th-century American male singers
20th-century American singers
20th Century Studios contract players
Metro-Goldwyn-Mayer contract players
RKO Pictures contract players